Gerrit Alexander Pressel (born 19 June 1990) is a German professional footballer who plays as a left-back for SC Victoria Hamburg.

Career
Pressel made his senior debut for Willem II in the 2010–11 season, on loan from Hamburger SV. He had previously made over 50 appearances for Hamburger SV II. In July 2012, he left Hamburg to join Regionalliga Nord side Holstein Kiel.

References

1990 births
Living people
German footballers
Footballers from Hamburg
Association football defenders
Eredivisie players
3. Liga players
Hamburger SV players
Hamburger SV II players
Willem II (football club) players
Holstein Kiel players
FC Eintracht Norderstedt 03 players
FC Teutonia Ottensen players
SC Victoria Hamburg players
German expatriate footballers
German expatriate sportspeople in the Netherlands
Expatriate footballers in the Netherlands